Peter Matshitse (born 13 December 1971) is a South African former professional footballer who played as a defender for Orlando Pirates, Moroka Swallows, Tembisa Classic, Lehurutshe Stocks Birds, Kaizer Chiefs, Zulu Royals, Black Leopards and Jomo Cosmos. He was rated as one of the best defenders in the country.

After retiring as a player, Mathshitse became a coach with Mothupi Birds United in January 2008.

References

1971 births
Living people
South African soccer players
Black Leopards F.C. players
Orlando Pirates F.C. players
Association football defenders